Jet Ski is the brand name of a personal watercraft (PWC) manufactured by Kawasaki, a Japanese company. The term is often used generically to refer to any type of personal watercraft used mainly for recreation, and it is also used as a verb to describe the use of any type of PWC.

A runabout-style PWC typically carries 3 people seated in a configuration like a typical bicycle or motorcycle.

Kawasaki Jet Ski 
"Jet Ski" is a proper noun and registered trademark of Kawasaki. The stand-up Kawasaki Jet Ski was the first commercially successful personal watercraft in America, having been released in 1972 (after reaching a license agreement with the inventor of the Sea-Doo, Clayton Jacobson II when his license agreement with Bombardier expired). The Kawasaki Jet Ski was the only commercially successful PWC for almost 16 years, from the introduction of the WSAA in October 1972 through the re-introduction of the  sit-down, runabout-style Bombardier Sea-Doo in 1988.

With the introduction of the Jet Ski, Kawasaki, in cooperation with aftermarket companies and enthusiasts, helped in creating the United States Jet Ski Boating Association (USJSBA). In 1982 the name was changed to the International Jet Sports Boating Association (IJSBA). At the start, only JS440 stand-ups were raced. After Kawasaki introduced the runabout style X2 in 1986, it gained its own class, later to be renamed the "Sport Class".

Stand-up model history

1972–1976
Kawasaki introduces the first production stand-up PWC in October 1972. The WSAA and follow-on WSAB were powered by modified 400cc 2-stroke twin-cylinder engines. The WSAA was designed with a flat hull and the WSAB came with a convex v-hull design. The design concepts distinctive of these original craft were a fully enclosed impeller for safety and self-righting, self-circling features. Without a lanyard the self-circling allowed the rider to swim back to the idling craft after falling off. Kawasaki called them "Water Jet" and "Power Skis" before they settled on the name "Jet Ski".

1976–1982
The 1976 JS400 was popular among thrill-seeking recreational riders and racers. The 1977 JS440 offered more power and performance. It was one of Kawasaki's longest-selling models. In 1982, Kawasaki responded to market demand for more performance with the JS550. The 550 featured a newly designed high-capacity mixed-flow pump driven by a more powerful 531cc engine. The 550 introduced an automatic rev limiter to prevent engine damage when the pump cavitates. The JS550 introduced underwater exhaust for quieter operation to the stand-up Kawasaki.

1982–1986
Kawasaki continued to improve the JS550 well into the 1990s. In 1986, Kawasaki added the JS300 to their model line-up, a single-cylinder 294cc two-stroke engine featuring automatic fuel /oil mixing. They also added the 650 X2, their first "sit-down" Jet Ski, and originator of the Sport Class for PWC racing.

1987–1992
Kawasaki introduces the completely redesigned JS650SX. It featured an even higher capacity axial flow pump and a powerful 635cc two-stroke twin engine in a modified V-hull design for increased maneuverability and stability.

In 1992, the company introduced a stand-up JS750-A. The engine was a twin-cylinder 743cc two-stroke with reed valves and automatic oil injection. The redesigned hull was lighter-weight and more maneuverable.

1995
The 750 SXI (JS750-B) is introduced and became the first stand-up Jet Ski with dual carburetors.

2003
Kawasaki introduces the SX-R 800 (JS800A), which increased displacement to 781cc, in the form of an in-line twin 2-stroke engine generating 80hp. The SX-R also moved to a fiberglass-reinforced plastic (FRP) hull and top deck.

2011
Due to US EPA restrictions, Kawasaki releases their final two-stroke stand-up, and the last year of the JS800 SX-R, to recognize the 37-year history of the stand-up JetSki.  The model designation was JS800ABF, with an MSRP of $7899.00.

2017
On October 6, 2016, Kawasaki reintroduced the stand-up Jet Ski. The 8 ft. 9 in., 550+ lb. SX-R 1500 shared little with its predecessors. Powered by a 160HP inline 4-cylinder four-stroke engine, the SX-R was described by one author as "on steroids" and having "lost some of the playfulness of early standup models". It holds 6.1 gallons of fuel, measures 104.5" long, 30.1" wide and 33.1" high.

Models
Kawasaki produced various models of the Jet Ski starting in 1972, beginning with the JS400 and leading up to the current JS1500.

Year and Model 
(“1995 Kawasaki Prices & Values”)
 1980: JS400
 1981: JS440
 1982: JS440, JS550
 1983: JS440, JS550
 1984: JS440, JS550
 1985: JS440, JS550
 1986: JS300 B-1, JS440A10, JS550
 1987: JS300-A1 300SX, JS300-B2, JS440-A11, JS550-A6, JS 650-A1 650SX
 1988: JS300-A2 300SX, JS300-B3, JS440-A12, JS550-A7, JS650-A2 650SX
 1989: JS300-A3 300SX. JS440-A13, JS550-A8, JS 650-A3 650SX
 1990: JS300-A4 300SX, JS440-A14, JS500-B1 550SX, JS650-A4SX
 1991: JS300-A5 300SX, JS 440-A15, JS550-C1 550SX, JS 650-B1 650SX
 1992: JS440-A16, JS550-C2 550SX, JS650-B2 650SX, JS750-A1 750SX
 1993: JS550-C3 550SX, JS650-B3 650SX, JS 750-A2 750SX
 1994: JS550-C4 550SX, JS750-A3 750SX
 1995: JS550-C5 550SX, JS750-A4 750SX, JS750 B-1 750SXI
 1996: JS750-B2 750SXI
 1997: Focused on sit-down Jet Ski
 1998: JS750-C1 SXI PRO
 1999: JS750-C2 SXI PRO
 2000: JS 750 SXI PRO
 2001: JS750 SXI PRO
 2002: JS750 SXI PRO
 2003: JS800 SXR
 2004: JS800 SXR
 2005: JS800 SXR
 2006: JS800 SXR
 2007: JS800 SXR
 2008: JS800 SXR
 2009: JS800 SXR
 2010: JS800 SXR
 2011: JS800 SXR
 2012-2016: N/A due to EPA laws and regulations
 2017: SX-R
 2018: SX-R
 2019: SX-R
 2020: SX-R
 2021: SX-R
 2022: SX-R

Other stand-up manufacturers
In 1990 Yamaha introduced the Super Jet. It was designed in consultation with Clayton Jacobson II. 2020 marks the last model year offered with a 2 stroke, 2021 models feature a 4 stroke engine.

In 1994-1995 Yamaha introduced the FX-1, which had a limited production of 1500 units.

In 2004 Bombardier introduced the Sea-Doo 3D.  Unfortunately it had an ill-fated life and was only sold as 2005-2007 model years.

Various manufacturers produce a range of aftermarket competition hulls for stand-up PWCs.

References

External links

Jet ski
Vehicles introduced in 1972
Brands that became generic
Personal water craft brands